La Jarrie is a commune in the Charente-Maritime department in southwestern France.

Geography
The commune consists of the small town La Jarrie and parts of the hamlets Grolleau, Chassagné and Puyvineux.

Population

See also
 Communes of the Charente-Maritime department

References

External links
 

Communes of Charente-Maritime
Charente-Maritime communes articles needing translation from French Wikipedia